Nicktoons (formerly Nicktoons Network) is an American pay television channel owned by Paramount Media Networks. The channel is geared towards children aged 7 to 11, and broadcasts reruns of original animated series from sister network Nickelodeon (known as Nicktoons) along with some other animated shows and feature films.

As of September 2018, approximately 56.9 million American households (51.3% of households with television) received Nicktoons.

History 

Nicktoons was launched as a standalone channel on May 1, 2002, as Nicktoons TV, part of the digital cable-exclusive MTV Digital Suite, in order to entice cable operators to pick up the network and give them a marketing advantage over satellite services. However, by early 2004, Nickelodeon management changed course and offered it to digital satellite services DirecTV and Dish Network. The network was originally marketed as commercial-free, with comedic promos involving Nickelodeon Animation Studios, two-minute cartoon shorts from foreign markets, and former program promotions that had previously been used on Nickelodeon taking up commercial time. By June 6, 2005, as the network's distribution increased, it began to carry regular advertising.

On September 28, 2009, the network's logo changed as part of Nickelodeon's universal rebranding effort. A high-definition feed was launched on August 13, 2013, and is available on several providers. Like Viacom's other HD channels, any programming produced in 4:3 SD is pillarboxed on this feed. As the network blended in more Nickelodeon programming into its schedule, the Nicktoons website was sunsetted, recommending viewers go to Nick.com instead before eventually being fully redirected to the Nick.com domain.

Programming 

Since its launch, Nicktoons has mainly aired programs carried over from the main Nickelodeon channel. Despite its name, the channel does not exclusively air Nicktoons, and has occasionally aired some of Nickelodeon's live-action series, such as The Thundermans and Henry Danger. Due to Nickelodeon moving a lot of newer content to the channel, all the older Nicktoons, such as Hey Arnold! and The Ren & Stimpy Show, were removed from the schedule. However, Rugrats airs on the channel occasionally. As of September 2021, the Nicktoons series that still remain are mostly more modern content, along with reruns of SpongeBob SquarePants, The Adventures of Jimmy Neutron, Boy Genius, and The Fairly OddParents.

In recent times, Nickelodeon has used the Nicktoons channel to burn-off remaining episodes of unsuccessful series, such as Bunsen Is a Beast, Ollie's Pack, season 10 of The Fairly OddParents, and Welcome to the Wayne.

NickSports 
On September 3, 2014, a two-hour Wednesday prime time programming block named NickSports was launched on the channel, tying into the Kids' Choice Sports inaugurated that year. The block presented mainly licensed programming focusing on sports, including the Rob Dyrdek-starring Wild Grinders and NFL Rush Zone: Guardians of the Core, along with sports-related feature films such as Bend It Like Beckham, Cool Runnings, and Space Jam. Sometime in 2015, the block was moved to a Friday prime time slot. The block ended in September 2018.

International versions

Active channels 
 United States – launched on May 1, 2002
 UK and Ireland – launched on July 22, 2002
 Netherlands – launched in 2007
 Germany – launched in March 2010
 Africa – launched on September 30, 2014
 Scandinavia – launched on February 1, 2017
 Arabia – launched on February 15, 2017
 Turkey – launched on February 20, 2017
 Poland – launched on 15 February 2018
 Hungary and Romania – launched on 15 April 2019
 Serbia, Croatia, Slovenia, Albania - launched on 14 July 2020

Defunct channels 
 France – launched on January 1, 2003, as a programming block on Canal J, rebranded as N-Toons on October 21, 2011, and closed down on July 31, 2015
 Latin America – launched on February 4, 2013, and closed down in late 2020, being replaced in major cable providers by the US feed of NickMusic
 Russia – launched on December 12, 2018, and closed down on April 28, 2022.

Mascot 
From 2006 until 2009, Nicktoons Network used a robot mascot in bumpers and advertisements for the channel. The mascot, named "ACOW," which stands for Animation Capital of the World, was a complex robot character with a large singular eye, animated using "photo-puppetry." ACOW was prominently featured on the NicktoonsNetwork.com website and was used as part of the "Nicktoons Network: Animation Capital of the World" logo. Several similar-looking eyeball-based characters were seen in promos for the network.

See also 

 Nick Jr. (block)
 Noggin
 N-Toons
 Nicktoonsters
 Nick Rewind

References

External links 

 2016 Decider's Oral History of "Nicktoons" interviews with cast and crew

Nicktoons (TV network)
2002 establishments in the United States
Children's television networks in the United States
English-language television stations in the United States
Television channels and stations established in 2002
Television networks in the United States

no:Nickelodeon